Fővárosi Szabó Ervin Könyvtár (literally Metropolitan Ervin Szabó Library) is the largest library network in Budapest, Hungary.

The Metropolitan Ervin Szabó Library's main branch is housed in the 19th-century neo-baroque Wenckheim Palace.

The municipal library needed more space as its collection grew, so it expanded to a network of additional buildings while restoring the palace as a national monument. The library is now 13,000 m² and houses Budapest's largest public collection of books with a capacity for 1,100,000 volumes.

In 2003, the International Real Estate Federation awarded the Prix d’Excellence to its central building.

See also
Ervin Szabó

References

External links

Metropolitan Ervin Szabó Library

Libraries in Hungary
Culture in Budapest
Baroque Revival architecture